Harry Byrne is an Irish rugby player.

Harry Byrne may also refer to:

Harry Byrne (sailor)
Harry Byrne, fictional character in Holby City, son of Faye Byrne

See also
Henry Byrne (disambiguation)
Harry Burns (disambiguation)